R Lalzirliana is a Mizo National Front politician from Mizoram. He is the current minister for power and electricity, art and culture, land resources, soil and water conservation and district council affairs departments of Mizoram.

Career
He was involved in the Young Mizo Association from 1983-1985 before he entered politics. He started contesting MLA elections under Congress party in 1998, 2003, 2008 and 2013 and also served as Vice President of Mizoram Pradesh Congress Committee. He was Home Minister under the Congress Government under Lalthanhawla from 2008 until he switched sides and moved on to the Mizo National Front government led by Zoramthanga in 2018. He contested the 2018 elections under MNF ticket in Tawi constituency.

Personal life
He married T. Lalthangmawii, and they have two sons and two daughters.

References 

Living people
People from Aizawl
Mizo National Front politicians
Mizoram MLAs 2018–2023
Mizo people
1949 births